Limerick County is a parliamentary constituency that has been represented in Dáil Éireann, the lower house of the Irish parliament or Oireachtas, since the 2016 general election, and previously as Limerick from 2011 to 2016. The constituency elects 3 deputies (Teachtaí Dála, commonly known as TDs) on the system of proportional representation by means of the single transferable vote (PR-STV).

History and boundaries
The Constituency Commission proposed in 2007 that at the next general election a new constituency called Limerick be created. It was established by the Electoral (Amendment) Act 2009 when it partially replaced the former constituencies of Limerick East and Limerick West. Most of the rural parts of the Limerick East constituency were transferred to the Limerick constituency and the western parts of the Limerick West constituency were transferred to the Kerry North–West Limerick constituency. It was represented only at the 2011 general election, electing 3 TDs.

The Constituency Commission proposed in its 2012 report that at the next general election the constituency of Limerick be renamed as Limerick County, with the transfer of territory from Kerry North–West Limerick.

TDs

Elections

2020 general election

2016 general election

2011 general election

See also
Elections in the Republic of Ireland
Politics of the Republic of Ireland
List of Dáil by-elections
List of political parties in the Republic of Ireland

References

Dáil constituencies
Politics of County Limerick
2011 establishments in Ireland
Constituencies established in 2011